Ognjen Čarapić (born 1 September 1998) is a Montenegrin professional basketball player for Podgorica of the Montenegrin First League and the ABA League Second Division.

Playing career 
Čarapić started practicing basketball at his hometown's club Mornar before moving to Podgorica's Montenegrin powerhouse Budućnost VOLI in 2012. In April 2014, he participated at the Jordan Brand Classic event in New York.

In September 2020, Čarapić signed with the Serbian club FMP of the ABA League. In January 2021, he parted ways with FMP to sign for Podgorica.

References

External links 
 Profile at aba-liga.com
 Profile at eurobasket.com

Living people
1998 births
ABA League players
Basketball League of Serbia players
Guards (basketball)
KK Budućnost players
KK FMP players
KK Mega Basket players
KK Podgorica players
Montenegrin men's basketball players
Montenegrin expatriate basketball people in Serbia
Serbs of Montenegro